Sheykhabad or Shaikhabad or Sheikh Abad or Shaikabad may refer to:

Fars Province
Sheykhabad, Fars, a village in Darab County
Shaikhabad, Sepidan, a village in Sepidan County

Gilan Province
Sheykhabad, Gilan, a village in Amlash County

Golestan Province
Sheykhabad-e Yolmeh Salian

Isfahan Province
Sheykhabad, Isfahan, a village in Nain County

Kerman Province
Sheykhabad, Kerman, a village in Anbarabad County
Sheykhabad, Kahnuj, a village in Kahnuj County

Kermanshah Province
Sheykhabad-e Olya, a village in Sahneh County
Sheykhabad-e Sofla, a village in Sahneh County

Lorestan Province
Sheykhabad, Delfan
Sheykhabad, Selseleh
Sheykhabad Sheykheh
Sheykhabad-e Zangivand

Mazandaran Province
Sheykhabad, Mazandaran, a village in Amol County

Razavi Khorasan Province
Sheykhabad, Razavi Khorasan

Semnan Province

South Khorasan Province
Sheykhabad, South Khorasan, a village in Khusf County

West Azerbaijan Province
Shaikhabad, West Azerbaijan, a village in Miandoab County

Yazd Province
Sheykhabad, Yazd, a village in Khatam County